Andriy Eduardovych Vyskrebentsev (born 27 October 2000) is a Ukrainian professional football midfielder who plays for Zvezda Saint Petersburg.

Career
Vyskrebentsev is a product mainly of Metalurh Donetsk and FC Mariupol youth sportive school systems.

He made his début for FC Mariupol in the Ukrainian Premier League as a substituted player in a match against defending champion FC Shakhtar Donetsk on 1 December 2019.

References

External links

 

2000 births
Living people
Sportspeople from Makiivka
Ukrainian footballers
Association football midfielders
Ukrainian expatriate footballers
Expatriate footballers in Belarus
Expatriate footballers in Russia
Ukrainian Premier League players
Ukrainian First League players
FC Mariupol players
FC Uzhhorod players
FC Slutsk players